Ro-39 was an Imperial Japanese Navy Kaichū type submarine of the K6 sub-class. Completed and commissioned in September 1943, she served in World War II and was sunk in February 1944 during her first war patrol.

Design and description
The submarines of the K6 sub-class were versions of the preceding K5 sub-class with greater range and diving depth. They displaced  surfaced and  submerged.

For surface running, the boats were powered by two  diesel engines, each driving one propeller shaft. When submerged each propeller was driven by a  electric motor. They could reach  on the surface and  underwater.

The boats were armed with four internal bow  torpedo tubes and carried a total of ten torpedoes. They were also armed with a single  L/40 anti-aircraft gun and two single  AA guns.

Construction and commissioning

Ro-39 was laid down as Submarine No. 205 on 8 August 1942 by the Sasebo Navy Yard at Sasebo, Japan. She had been renamed Ro-39 by the time she was launched on 6 March 1943 and she was completed and commissioned on 12 September 1943.

Service history

Upon commissioning, Ro-39 was attached to the Maizuru Naval District. On 25 December 1943 she was assigned to Submarine Division 34 in the  6th Fleet. In company with the submarine , she departed Maizuru on 28 December 1943 bound for Truk, which she reached on 6 January 1944. At Truk, she took aboard stores from the auxiliary submarine tender  on 17 January 1944.

Ro-38 got underway from Truk on 20 January 1944 with the commander of Submarine Division 34 aboard to begin her first war patrol, assigned a patrol area in the Caroline Islands in the vicinity of Woleai. On 22 January 1944, she received orders to rescue Imperial Japanese Navy Air Service aircrews of the 531st Naval Air Group at Woleai and the 755th Naval Air Group at Maloelap.

The United States Navy destroyer  gained radar contact on a vessel on the surface on the night of 1 February 1944. She closed with it and fired star shells which illuminated a submarine, probably Ro-39.

The 6th Fleet received a distress signal on 2 February 1944 at 10:38 Japan Standard Time that Ro-39 transmitted as she crash-dived, but it was indecipherable. On 6 February and again on 10 February 1944, the 6th Fleet ordered Ro-39 to return to Truk, but she did not acknowledge the order either time. On 5 March 1944, the Imperial Japanese Navy declared her to be presumed lost east of Wotje with all 70 hands. She was stricken from the Navy list on 30 April 1944.

Notes

References
 

 

Ro-35-class submarines
Kaichū type submarines
Ships built by Sasebo Naval Arsenal
1943 ships
World War II submarines of Japan
Japanese submarines lost during World War II
World War II shipwrecks in the Pacific Ocean
Maritime incidents in February 1944
Ships lost with all hands
Submarines sunk by United States warships